The 2003 Nigerian Senate election in Delta State was held on April 12, 2003, to elect members of the Nigerian Senate to represent Delta State. Patrick Osakwe representing Delta North, Felix Ibru representing Delta Central and James Manager representing Delta South all won on the platform of the Peoples Democratic Party.

Overview

Summary

Results

Delta North 
The election was won by Patrick Osakwe of the Peoples Democratic Party.

Delta Central 
The election was won by Felix Ibru of the Peoples Democratic Party.

Delta South 
The election was won by James Manager of the Peoples Democratic Party.

References 

April 2003 events in Nigeria
Delta State Senate elections
Del